Chester Waterside Station of the Philadelphia Electric Company is a historic former coal-fired power station, located on the Delaware River in Chester, Delaware County, southeastern Pennsylvania.

Built by the Philadelphia Electric Company, it is currently owned by the PECO Energy Company of the Exelon Corporation. The complex has been converted into an office building.

Architecture
The original section of the Station building was built in 1916, and consists of the Boiler House with attached Coal Towers and Turbine Hall, and the Switch House.   The complex was designed by architect John T. Windrim and engineer William C.L. Eglin, and featured then recent advances in generating technology and industrial construction. The principal facades were designed in the Beaux-Arts style.

The Turbine Hall Annex addition was built in 1939-1942.

Also located on the property is the two-story, red brick Machine Shop building.  It was also built by the Philadelphia Electric Company.

History
The complex was listed on the National Register of Historic Places in 2007.

The Chester Waterside Station  was documented by the federal HAER−Historic American Engineering Record, with extensive exterior and interior photography by renowned architectural photographer Jack Boucher in 1997 and 1998; architectural drawings; and a detailed descriptive report of the facility design and history, and its contemporary industrial history contexts.

In 2016, the machine shop was converted into a 16,500 square foot indoor training facility and offices for the Philadelphia Union Major League Soccer club.

See also

HAER−Historic American Engineering Record in Pennsylvania
List of power stations in Pennsylvania
National Register of Historic Places listings in Delaware County, Pennsylvania
Power plants in Pennsylvania

References

External links

Coal-fired power stations in Pennsylvania
Buildings and structures in Delaware County, Pennsylvania
Chester, Pennsylvania
Delaware River
Exelon
Energy infrastructure completed in 1916
Industrial buildings and structures on the National Register of Historic Places in Pennsylvania
Historic American Engineering Record in Philadelphia
Beaux-Arts architecture in Pennsylvania
Energy infrastructure on the National Register of Historic Places
National Register of Historic Places in Delaware County, Pennsylvania